John Machethe "Mo" Muiruri (born 10 October 1979) is a Kenyan footballer who played for Moss FK in Norway as a midfielder. He was known for his close ball control and ability to dribble the ball. He is one of the most talented midfield quartet of the Kenya National team, Harrambe Stars along with McDonald Mariga, Robert Mambo, Jamal Mohamed and Titus Mulama. He led Kisii School to two national championships before graduating in 1997.

Muiruri has played 20 international matches for Kenya as well as 13 matches at U-21 and U-23 level. He appeared at the 2004 African Cup of Nations.

External links
Club bio
 Kenyan Footie - Kenyan Football Portal
 

1979 births
Living people
Kenyan footballers
Association football midfielders
Tusker F.C. players
K.A.A. Gent players
Beerschot A.C. players
Moss FK players
Belgian Pro League players
Kenya international footballers
2004 African Cup of Nations players
Kenyan expatriate footballers
Kenyan expatriate sportspeople in Norway
Kenyan expatriate sportspeople in Belgium
Expatriate footballers in Norway
Expatriate footballers in Belgium